K9 is a science-fiction adventure series focusing on the adventures of the robot dog K9 from the television show Doctor Who, achieved by mixing computer animation and live action. It is aimed at an audience of 11- to 15-year-olds. A single series of the programme was made in Brisbane, Australia, with co-production funding from Australia and the United Kingdom. It aired in 2009 and 2010 on Network Ten in Australia, and on Disney XD in the UK, as well as being broadcast on other Disney XD channels in Europe.

Development
K9's co-creator, Bob Baker, had long sought to produce a television series starring the character.  Indeed, in 1997 Doctor Who Magazine announced that Baker and producer Paul Tams were producing a four-part pilot series provisionally called The Adventures of K9. The magazine stated that the pilot would be filmed that year "on a 'seven-figure' budget", and that the BBC had expressed interest in purchasing the broadcast rights. However, funding proved elusive, and despite persistent rumours, the series remained in "development hell" for many years. 
In 2006, Jetix Europe announced that they were "teaming up" with Baker, Tams, and London-based distributor Park Entertainment to develop a 26-part series, then titled K9 Adventures and set in space. This announcement, timed to coincide with K9's return to Doctor Who in the episode "School Reunion", was picked up in the British media and Doctor Who fan press. In 2007, Park Entertainment revealed that the main setting for the series (by then retitled K-9) would be the Platte, "an old Prairie-class spacecraft" once used for asteroid colonization. In addition to K9, the characters would include Slocum, a thirty-something "space gypsy", and Djinn, "an overactive computer module in the shape of an attractive young woman". This early premise was abandoned before production began in Australia.

Production
Each episode of K-9 is approximately 25 minutes long, made for Disney XD (formerly Jetix) and Network Ten by Stewart & Wall Entertainment, in association with London-based distribution company Park Entertainment. The project is being overseen by Baker; the television series concept was developed by Australian writers Shane Krause and Shayne Armstrong, in association with Baker and Paul Tams. Krause and Armstrong are the primary writers for the series; four episodes were written by Queensland writer Jim Noble. The series is produced by Penny Wall and Richard Stewart of Stewart & Wall Entertainment Pty Ltd, and Simon Barnes of Park Entertainment. Grant Bradley of Daybreak Pacific and Jim Howell serve as executive producers. Michael Carrington, head of animation and programme acquisitions for BBC Children's, told Broadcast that the BBC had declined the opportunity to be involved in the production of a K9 series, saying, "As the BBC is already committed to a number of spin-off projects, we concluded that a K9 series may simply be an extension too far." BBC-owned characters like the Doctor will not appear in the series, due to rights considerations.

In July 2007, the Australian Film Finance Corporation approved funding for the series, and the programme was pre-sold to Network Ten. The Pacific Film and Television Commission (PFTC) (subsequently renamed Screen Queensland) also provided additional financing. The first series was shot between 3 December 2008 and 8 May 2009. The series is produced in Brisbane, Australia, shooting on location around the city and on a set built in a South Brisbane warehouse. A logo for the series was released on 27 February bearing some similarities to the original font seen on the casing of K9. A trailer produced to promote the series at MIPTV was released on 2 April 2009. As it was made early in production, the music, titles, and voice of K9 were not the final ones used in the programme. A second trailer was released on 1 October 2009.

Concept
K-9 is set in near-future London, with 14-year-old characters Starkey and Jorjie, alongside a Professor Gryffen, who is experimenting with a Space-Time Manipulator, and 15-year-old Darius who runs errands for Gryffen. K9 Mark I follows the villainous reptilian warrior Jixen who came through a space-time portal created by the professor's experiments and saves the Londoners. While protecting them, K9 is forced to self-destruct, but is able to give Starkey instructions to rebuild him in a more advanced form. K9 and the humans then form the front line defence against alien menaces from outer space and other times. The Brisbane Times reports that the series is set in London in the year 2050 and Professor Gryffen is employed by a clandestine government agency, "The Department". The design of K9 is noticeably different from that seen in Doctor Who because although Bob Baker owns the character rights to K9, the original character design is owned by the BBC.

Connections to Doctor Who
As this is not a BBC production, direct references to Doctor Who are not legally allowed for rights reasons.  However, Baker and Tams have confirmed that this K9 is the original K9 Mark I, who appeared in Doctor Who from The Invisible Enemy (1977) to The Invasion of Time (1978). This model was last seen in the possession of Leela on Gallifrey; in the first episode, the robot dog is damaged and undergoes a "regeneration" into a new, more advanced form capable of flight. He then explains that most of his memory was damaged, so he cannot remember anything about himself or his past.

The decision to launch the show in Australia on 3 April, the launch date for Doctor Who'''s "The Eleventh Hour", which introduced Matt Smith as the Eleventh Doctor, was interpreted by the Gawker Media blog io9 as a way of taking advantage of the latter show's popularity to boost interest in the new show.

Episodes

Casting
John Leeson reprises his role as the voice of K9. Sixteen-year-old Brisbane native Philippa Coulthard plays Jorjie Turner, a rebellious 15-year-old whose mother works for the mysterious "Department". 20-year-old Keegan Joyce plays Starkey, a 14-year-old orphan rebel; and 21-year-old Daniel Webber plays Darius Pike, an assistant to Professor Gryffen, who is played by Canadian character actor Robert Moloney. Recurring cast members include Robyn Moore as Jorjie's mother June Turner, and Connor Van Vuuren as Inspector Drake, later replaced by Jared Robinsen as Inspector Thorne.

Cast
John Leeson as K9
Philippa Coulthard as Jorjie Turner
Keegan Joyce as Starkey
Daniel Webber as Darius Pike
Robert Moloney as Alistair Gryffen
Robyn Moore as Jorjie's mother June Turner
Connor Van Vuuren as Drake
Jared Robinsen as Thorne

Broadcast
The first episode aired as a sneak preview of the series on Halloween 2009 on satellite channel Disney XD in the UK & Ireland. The full series later aired on Network Ten in Australia, Disney XD in the UK & Ireland, Scandinavia, Poland, Italy and The Netherlands; and Disney Channel CEE in Bulgaria, Romania, Moldava, Slovakia, Hungary and the Czech Republic. It was subsequently syndicated around the globe, including on Channel 5 in the UK and on Cartoon Network in New Zealand. In the UK, Channel 5 broadcast the first season between December 2010 and April 2011. The US cable channel Syfy began airing the series on 25 December 2012, initially by broadcasting the entire first season in an all-day marathon.

Home releases

MerchandiseThe Complete Book of K-9, a piece of non-fiction that follows the story of K9 through all four models, crossing over from Doctor Who, K-9 & Company, The Sarah Jane Adventures and K-9 itself, has been advertised. A tie-in called The K-9 Storybook was also due to be released in 2013, containing behind-the-scenes extras, short stories, comic strips and other material from the live-action series. There are also K-9 Mark 2 figurines ready for sale.

In 2019, Obverse Books published the third in their Time's Mosaic series of guidebooks to Doctor Who by Finn Clark, in part covering the K9 Television series and associated spin-offs.

Awards
In 2009, Shayne Armstrong and SP Krause, writers and developers of the series for television, won the John Hinde Award for Science-Fiction at the Australian Writers Guild AWGIES for their script for the episode "The Fall of the House of Gryffen". The episode was also a nominee in the category for Best Children's Television in that year.

In 2009, Shayne Armstrong and SP Krause were also nominated as finalists in the Queensland Premier's Literary Awards for Best Television Script for the episode "Regeneration".

In 2010, Tony O'Loughlan, Director of Photography for the show won two bronze awards at the Queensland and Northern Territory Cinematographer Awards for his work on the episodes Angel of the North and The Eclipse of the Korven.

Series VFX Director and Director of 4 other episode, David Napier, was nominated for 'Best Direction in Children's Television' at the 2010 Australian Directors Guild Awards for episode 26 'Eclipse of the Korven'.

 Proposed further series and film 
The show's creators stated that a second series was in development. A new design of K9 for series 2 was scheduled to be unveiled by Bob Baker and Paul Tams at the Who Shop on 27 July 2013. Bob Baker told an interviewer in 2014, "Paul and I are in process of getting another series going. Hope it doesn’t take another eleven years!". Paul Tams revealed on a Kickstarter page for his proposed Marti series that he and Baker are sitting out a protracted production deal before bringing back the series in a reboot titled K9 Adventures.  In April 2016, Bob Baker stated in an interview posted on K9 OFFICIAL PAGE on Facebook that the TV series will not continue and they will for now just focus on the TimeQuake film.

On 24 October 2015, Bob Baker and Paul Tams announced the film K9: TimeQuake'' which was destined for cinemas in 2017 and was to feature the robot dog facing off against classic Doctor Who villain Omega in deep space. Despite the film not materialising, it was announced on 9 September 2018 that "a new multi million dollar series" was in development under partnership with "a major US/UK company" prior to the release of the feature film. On 20 December 2020 'Megabytes', an anthology featuring K9, was released which was teased as being "the road to TimeQuake". When Bob Baker died in November 2021, the official Twitter page released a statement "Bob had recently completed scripts for both a new K9 Film and TV series, which will continue in tribute to Bob and his legacy."

References

External links 

 
 Bob Baker
 K9 Official
 
 The Doctor Who Site

 
2009 Australian television series debuts
2010 Australian television series endings
2000s British children's television series
2010s British children's television series
2000s British science fiction television series
2010s British science fiction television series
2009 British television series debuts
2010 British television series endings
Australian children's television series
Doctor Who spin-offs
English-language television shows
Network 10 original programming
Australian television spin-offs
British television spin-offs
Television series about robots
Television series about teenagers
Television series set in the 2050s
Television shows about dogs
Disney XD original programming
Television series created by Bob Baker (scriptwriter)